Trigonopterus allotopus is a species of flightless weevil in the genus Trigonopterus from Indonesia.

Etymology
The specific name is derived in Latinized form from the Greek words allos, meaning "foreign", and topos, meaning "place".  The name was chosen because T. allotopus is most south-western of the T. politus species group.

Description
The species has an ovate body measuring 2.4 mm long.  General coloration is black with rust-colored antennae.

Range and habitat

T. allotopus has been found in leaf litter, but is believed to live in foliage.

References

allotopus
Beetles described in 2014
Beetles of Asia